Myrza-Ake is a large village in the Osh Region of Kyrgyzstan. It is part of the Özgön District. Its population was 16,011 in 2021.

Population

Climate
In Myrza-Ake, the climate is cold and temperate. There is more rainfall in winter than in summer. The Köppen-Geiger climate classification is Dsa. About  of precipitation falls annually.

References

Populated places in Osh Region